Wamey ([wæ-meỹ], Meyny), or Konyagi (Conhague, Coniagui, Koniagui), is a Senegambian language of Senegal and Guinea.

References

Fula–Tenda languages
Languages of Senegal
Languages of Guinea